Pierfrancesco Renga (born 12 June 1968 in Udine, Italy) is an Italian singer-songwriter. He won the Sanremo Music Festival in 2005 with the song Angelo. In 2001 he won the Mia Martini critics award at Sanremo Festival. He also took part in the Sanremo Music Festival in 2009 with Uomo senza età and in 2012 with La tua bellezza.

In 2010 he dedicated to his ex-longtime girlfriend Ambra Angiolini (2004 - 2015), the song "Stai con me" written by Emilio Munda.

Discography

Albums

 2001 Francesco Renga (ITA #46)
 2002 Tracce (ITA #6 - Platinum 100,000+)
 2004 Camere con vista (ITA #4 - 2× Platinum 200,000+)
 2007 Ferro e cartone (ITA #1 - Platinum 120,000+)
 2009 Orchestraevoce (ITA #7 - Platinum - 100,000+)
 2010 Un giorno bellissimo (ITA #7 - Gold - 30,000+)
 2012 Fermoimmagine (ITA #15)
 2014 Tempo Reale (ITA #1)
 2016 Scriverò il tuo nome (ITA #1)
 2019 L'altra metà (ITA #2)

References

1968 births
Living people
Italian male singers
Sanremo Music Festival winners
People from Udine